Zakharevich, Russian Захаревич,  is a Russian patrimonial surname, it means son of Zakhar. Notable people with the surname include:

Igor Zakharevich (1963-2008), Russian chess Grandmaster
Valery Zakharevich (born 1967), Russian fencer
Yury Zakharevich (born 1963), Russian weightlifter

Russian-language surnames